Rabit may refer to:
 Rabit (musician), American producer of electronic music
 Ranked Ballot Initiative of Toronto (RaBIT)
 Batak Rabit, a town in Malaysia

See also 
 Rabbit (disambiguation)
 Rabid (disambiguation)
 Rapid (disambiguation)
 Rapi:t, a train service in Japan
 Ribat, a military fortification of the Middle East